Monique Limon (born 5 December 1953) is a French educator and politician of La République En Marche! (LREM) who served as a member the National Assembly from 2017 to 2022, representing the 7th constituency of the Isère department.

Early career
Before entering politics, Limon worked as a specialist at schools for troubled teens.

Political career
Limon served as the deputy mayor for the Bressieux commune as an independent. She had planned on competing for the 2017 French parliamentary election with the Socialist Party (PS), but instead decided to join En Marche!

In parliament, Limon served on the Committee on Economic Affairs (2017-2019) and the Committee on Social Affairs (2019-2020) before moving to the Committee on Legal Affairs (2020–2022). In this capacity, she was the parliament's rapporteur on legislation aimed at opening adoption to unmarried couples.

Controversy
In November 2021, news media reported that Limon had received anonymous death threats.

References

1953 births
Living people
Deputies of the 15th National Assembly of the French Fifth Republic
Women members of the National Assembly (France)
La République En Marche! politicians
21st-century French women politicians